Torodora sabahana is a moth in the family Lecithoceridae. It was described by Kyu-Tek Park and Sang-Mi Lee in 2012. It is found on Borneo.

References

Moths described in 2012
Torodora